"Jasenovac i Gradiška Stara" is a Croatian song promoting the Ustaše massacres in World War II. The lyrics celebrate the World War II genocide of Serbs in Herzegovina.
In 2003, Matija Babić, a journalist at Index.hr, criticized the Croatian band Thompson for performing the song, as well as Croatian Radiotelevision, Croatia Records and other media for continuing to cover Thompson as a mainstream artist. In 2007, Efraim Zuroff, while reporting in the Jerusalem Post on a Thompson performance at Maksimir Stadium, said that Marko Perković, the lead vocalist, gained notoriety for having performed the song which was overtly fascist, and criticized Thompson concerts as an occasion for a display of extremist nationalists.

Perković first acknowledged, then later denied performing the song stating that "he is a musician, not a politician". An organizer for a Thompson tour of New York City in 2007 defended Perković, claiming the musician did not write the song nor is a copy available on any of his albums. According to the Anti Defamation League, "various media accounts report that Thompson's concerts in Europe begin with the traditional 'war cry' of the Ustashe. Concertgoers, mostly young people, many wearing black shirts with Ustashe insignia and carrying banners with anti-Serb and anti-Roma rhetoric, often respond with Nazi salutes. Ustashe paraphernalia is allegedly sold at the concerts, as well."

References

Ustaše songs
Year of song missing
Persecution of Serbs
Anti-Serbian sentiment
Ustaše
Far-right politics in Croatia